The Cheerful Insanity of Giles, Giles and Fripp is a 1968 album from the English group Giles, Giles and Fripp. The music shows a varied mix of pop, psychedelic rock, folk, jazz and classical influences. The songs on each LP side are connected with comedic spoken word pieces, "The Saga of Rodney Toady" and "Just George", which tell stories.

The album had little recognition on first release, but has gained more attention through multiple reissues. According to Robert Fripp the album sold only 500 copies. This information came from his royalty statement, but it seems unlikely that this was the total number sold on initial release. Most copies are stereo, but a rare mono LP was also released in the UK. The original United States and Canadian editions had a different cover from that of the UK version.

There are at least 4 CD editions: the first was in Japan with no bonus tracks, followed by US and UK releases with bonus tracks compiled from singles and previously unreleased recordings. A later Japanese re-issue in a paper sleeve contained the bonus tracks as well as a bonus paper sleeve reproduction of the US cover. The most recent CD released, by Eclectic Discs, also contains the bonus tracks.

Also during 1968 the group recorded a series of demos at home, which would be released as The Brondesbury Tapes in 2001. Following this album Peter Giles was replaced on bass by Greg Lake. Soon after that the band changed their repertoire and renamed themselves King Crimson.

Track listing

Personnel

Giles, Giles & Fripp
 Robert Fripp – guitars, mellotron, spoken word
 Peter Giles – bass, lead and backing vocals
 Michael Giles – drums, percussion, lead and backing vocals, spoken word

Additional personnel
 Ted Barker, Cliff Hardy – trombone
 Raymond Cohen, Gerry Fields, Kelly Isaccs, Boris Pecker, William Reid, G. Salisbury – violin
 John Coulling, Rebecca Patten – viola
 Alan Ford, Charles Tunnell – cello
 Ivor Raymonde – string arrangements
 "The Breakaways" – backing vocals
 Mike Hill, Nicky Hopkins – keyboards

Production
 Produced by Wayne Bickerton
 Engineers: Terry Johnson, Bill Price, Martin Smith
 Re-mastering: Anthony Hawkins

References

External links
 Elephant Talk Wiki entry
 Ground and Sky review

Giles, Giles and Fripp albums
1968 albums
Robert Fripp albums
Michael Giles albums
Deram Records albums